Selimiye is a village in Antalya Province (near Manavgat and Side, about 75 km from the city of Antalya), on the south coast of Anatolia.

Turkish Riviera
Villages in Antalya Province